The  is a women's professional wrestling title promoted by both Japanese professional wrestling promotions Pro Wrestling Zero1 and Super Fireworks Pro Wrestling (Chō Hanabi Puroresu). , there have been a total of seven reigns shared between 6 different champions. The current holder is Hiroyo Matsumoto who is in her second reign.

Title history

Combined reigns

Notes

References 

Pro Wrestling Zero1 championships
Women's professional wrestling championships